is a Japanese artistic gymnast, representing Japan at the 2016 Summer Olympics with the Japan women's national gymnastics team.

References 

1998 births
Japanese female artistic gymnasts
Living people
Gymnasts from Tokyo
Gymnasts at the 2016 Summer Olympics
Olympic gymnasts of Japan
Universiade medalists in gymnastics
Gymnasts at the 2018 Asian Games
Medalists at the 2018 Asian Games
Asian Games bronze medalists for Japan
Asian Games medalists in gymnastics
Universiade bronze medalists for Japan
Medalists at the 2017 Summer Universiade
21st-century Japanese women